|}

The Towton Novices' Chase is a Grade 2 National Hunt steeplechase in Great Britain which is open to horses aged five years or older. It is run at Wetherby over a distance of about 3 miles (3 miles and 45 yards, or 4,869 metres), and during its running there are nineteen fences to be jumped. The race is for novice chasers, and it is scheduled to take place each year in late January or early February.

The event is named after the village of Towton, which is located several miles to the south of Wetherby. It was first run in 1996, and the inaugural winner, Mr Mulligan, went on to win the following year's Cheltenham Gold Cup.

Winners

See also
 Horseracing in Great Britain
 List of British National Hunt races

References

 Racing Post:

 aberford.net – "Declared Runners" (2006).
 pedigreequery.com – Towton Novices' Chase – Wetherby.

National Hunt races in Great Britain
Wetherby Racecourse
National Hunt chases
Recurring sporting events established in 1996